China National Highway 103 (G103) is the main traffic corridor between Beijing and Tianjin. It goes from Tongzhou Beijing to Tianjin and then to the coastal area of Binhai on the outskirts of Tianjin, and runs to approximately 163 km.

This is the shortest China National Highway within those that start from 1.

Route and distance

See also
 China National Highways

103
Road transport in Tianjin
Road transport in Beijing